KABF (88.3 FM) is a community radio station in Little Rock, Arkansas, United States. Its nickname is "The Voice of the People" which refers to its populist official mission: to serve middle- and lower-income Arkansans. It broadcasts at 88.3 FM and is an organ of the Arkansas Broadcasting Foundation (hence the call letters ABF).

KABF is non-corporate and non-commercial. Its format is music and talk, with diverse programming.   The station went on the air on August 31, 1984.  It broadcasts at 91,000 watts from its transmitter at the Shinall Mountain antenna farm, near the city's Chenal Valley neighborhood, and its primary coverage radius is 60 miles. The station is affiliated with the Association of Community Organizations for Reform Now and shares a building with ACORN's headquarters at 2101 South Main Street in Little Rock. Like all public broadcasting, KABF relies on listener contributions for a large part of its operating budget.

Its sister station is KNON in Dallas, Texas.

See also
List of community radio stations in the United States

External links
Official KABF website

ABF
Community radio stations in the United States